"Hello My Love" is a song by Irish pop vocal band Westlife. It was released on 10 January 2019 as the lead single from the band's eleventh studio album, Spectrum, and is their first single to be released under Universal Music Group and Virgin EMI Records. It is also their first official single in eight years since the release of their last single, "Lighthouse", in 2011. The song is written by Ed Sheeran and Steve Mac. As of 30 November 2021, this is their eighth biggest single of all-time in the United Kingdom with 54.5 million streams in the country alone as of 30 November 2021.

It reached number-two in Ireland and Scotland, it is their highest charting on their official singles charts since the band's "What About Now" single in 2009, ten years before. Also their first chart-topper in 2019 and in 2010s decade. The single stayed at number-one for two weeks in the UK Physical Chart, the group's highest charting since their 2005 and 2006 singles, "You Raise Me Up" and "The Rose". The single was certified Gold in 2020 by the British Phonographic Industry and 2× Platinum by the Irish Recorded Music Association.

Background, development, and release
Since they announced their breakup in 2011 and their last appearance together in 2012, several rumors about them reuniting and making new musics have appeared. On 23 September 2018, several Irish news outlets started reporting that the group has been signed to Universal Music Group and Virgin EMI Records for a new music record deal. On 3 October 2018, the group formally announced on their official social media accounts that there would be new music coming soon. According to reports they've been preparing for the comeback for the past twelve months. Group member Mark Feehily also said in 2017 he hoped to get them all together for a proper catch-up. Band members Nicky Byrne and Shane Filan stated about their reunion, "We still have a lot that we want to achieve as a band and we want to bring our new music to fans all over the world" and "While we were away, we realised what Westlife really meant to the fans — and to us."

With regards to their new music, Feehily and Filan added, "We're not trying to change Westlife's sound, we're trying to evolve", "We need to be a Westlife 2.0, a better version of ourselves. We wanted to come back and recreate Westlife's sound, but better, and be a better band, and the most important thing about any band is music." Few seconds of the new single was heard on their 2019 concert tour The Twenty Tour advertisements on British and Irish radio stations in October 2018. On 19 November 2018, band manager Louis Walsh confirmed the title on The Irish News, calling it their first comeback single and an introduction to their new sound. He added, "They're just pulling together the final promo details." It was the band's thirty-third single overall and twenty-seventh single to be released in the United Kingdom. This is the group's fourth single released in the 2010s decade including the Helping Haiti charity single as part of an assemble. This is their first time since their debut in 1999 to release a lead single not in the last quarter or "ber" months of the year.

On 7 January 2019, they officially announced the release date of the single would be on 10 January 2019 in all of their social media accounts with a short official audio clip of the song. It was their first time releasing a single in the month of January in Ireland and UK. On 8 January 2019, they revealed the official photo cover (in GIF format on their social accounts) of the single with a caption "8:30am #HelloMyLove" which means was the single's time of premiere. At the same day, several British radio stations and some regional social network accounts of Universal Music reported the date of the first play of the new single. China, Malaysia, Mexico, Poland, Singapore, and Thailand confirmed the first play of the single on the same day. BBC Radio 2 in the UK and 2FM in Ireland will play the track earlier with at least a 15-minute and 5-minute differences respectively. Sweden's RIX FM said they would premiere it on 0930 GMT on the same day. On 9 January 2019, Filan revealed a part of the lyrics of the single after the Official Charts Company revealed some parts of the lyrics to the song on 8 January 2019. "#HelloMyLove" and "Westlife" keywords trended on Twitter on the time of its premiere on 10 January 2019.

This is the first time they released an electronic-dance-pop music single. There was an unreleased acoustic version and a remix version of the song in a four minutes and fourteen seconds and three minutes and thirty-one seconds lengths respectively according to Phonographic Performance Limited music licensing site. The acoustic version was first released on 25 January 2019 and the remix version was released on 8 February 2019 after. The track was included in the disc 2 number 34 of Now That's What I Call Music! 102 compilation album on 12 April 2019. The first time since 2011 on Now That's What I Call Music! 80 album with their single, "Lighthouse".

Composition and lyrics
"Hello My Love" is a pop-EDM song that runs for 3 minutes and 34 seconds. The acoustic version runs for 4 minutes and 14 seconds. The John Gibbons remix runs for 3 minutes and 31 seconds. It is described as a soaring solid gold pop anthem featuring the band's epic trademark vocal harmonies. Also promoted as a not your typical Westlife single. It was specifically written by Mac and Sheeran for Westlife months before they had even announced their reunion on 3 October 2018. The demo version of the song was by Sheeran. Jonathan Vaughtrey of  Wiwibloggs described the lyrics, "They are singing to their partner and thanking her. Even though there are 'plenty of fish in the sea', they're grateful that they were able to meet and she chose to spend her life with them: 'Hello, my love / I’ve been searching for someone like you / For most my life / Happiness ain't a thing I'm used to…For all of time, all I know / It's just my angel and me'." According to sheet music published by Universal Music Publishing on Musicnotes.com, "Hello My Love" is composed in the key of F major and set in common time at a moderate tempo of 122 beats per minute. Westlife's voices range from C4 to a high C6. It is the first lead single of the band with all its members have major lines in a song since their 2001 single, "Uptown Girl". Also, their first single and first original song and single to do so since their 2006 single, "Amazing".

Critical reception
Before the release of the single, Rob Copsey of the Official Charts Company said, "To be clear, the group's first new track in eight years, called Hello My Love, is upbeat – for a Westlife single. We clock its bpm at around 128bpm, placing it between Uptown Girl and the criminally underappreciated Bop Bop Baby on the uptempo scale of their singles catalogue. If we had to compare it to anything on the Top 40 of late, it'd be in realm of Jess Glynne's All I Am meets Ed Sheeran's Castle on the Hill. Steve has worked with Westlife from the very beginning, and on Hello My Love he manages to update their sound without sacrificing their essence. Speaking of which, something else at the core of Westlife is pure and unadulterated schmaltz, making Ed Sheeran the ideal person to write the song." Aoife Hanna of Bustle expressed the song is filled with self-deprecating humour, lyrics that could charm the pants off even the coldest heart. The song was also part of the new tracks reviewed at its premiere week by The Guardian. Thomas Cedergren of Rockfarbror.se awarded the song 4/5. Musicserver.cz awarded the song 7/10.

Wiwibloggs described the song, "A subtle keyboard opening draws the listener into the track. Then once the chorus comes, and we're hit with the quartet's combined vocals, it's clear that the group are very much still on top of their game all these years later. The song's warm and uplifting spirit will no doubt get fans, both new and old, singing along." Peter Robinson of Popjustice noted, "It's better than you'd expect a Westlife song to be at this stage, but not quite as good as you'd expect an Ed Sheeran song to be, despite being a not-particularly-well-disguised partial rewrite of Castle On The Hill, which actually is one of Ed's best songs. Includes a line about having 'hair growing where it's meant to'". Alicia Adejobi of the Metro said it's a "radio-friendly track that boasts all of Ed's trademarks – a catchy beat and memorable lyrics." Their former bandmate Brian McFadden tweeted on 10 January 2019 that it was "a great song and great production." On iTunes Store editor's notes for the song, they said: "The Irish pop vets reunite for an upbeat cut of romantic bliss." Vevo UK called it as "song of the year".

Byrne expressed on The Straits Times that the reaction to the song has been encouraging. Egan said the song is about "finding the right person and being in love, a little understanding that we all have imperfections and that it does not matter, you love people for who they are and nobody has to be perfect, love is what you need and find someone you truly love will make you happy forever." Feehily added the song is "upbeat, positive, colourful pop", "We have been away, the business has evolved with the introduction of streaming and we have been delighted to see that our first single worked so well round the world in the streaming era.", and "Hello My Love has been so popular, it's even affecting our potential single choice for the third single, the fourth single…"

Commercial performance
"Hello My Love" premiered on 10 January 2019, Thursday, 0830 GMT. It was released only under sixteen hours of its first week, the only allotted time for the combined sales to be counted in the official charts of the said week. It reached number-one on the Amazon UK also in iTunes Store Top Songs in more than fifteen countries that include the United Kingdom and their home country Ireland, reached top 10 in 23 countries, and charted in more than 50 countries only minutes after its release. It also charted at iTunes Pop Top Songs of Japan and the United States. It was released being not included in the pre-orders list prior to its release. It sold over five thousand combined sales according to Music Week in UK. Also on its debut week, it charted at number three on Scottish Singles Chart, UK Singles Downloads Chart and UK Singles Sales Chart, and number sixty-seven on Irish Singles Chart. It has the record for the highest sales position for a song missing the official top 100 on week one or so. On its second week, it premiered at number-seven in the UK Singles Chart Update, it peaked at the number-one spot on Ireland Digital Song Sales, it rose to number-two on Irish Singles Chart (where they missed the top spot by thirty-nine units to "Sweet But Psycho" by Ava Max), Scottish Singles Chart and UK Singles Sales Chart. Number-five on UK Singles Downloads Chart. It also peaked at number-one on UK Singles Physical Chart, the group's highest charting since their 2006 single, "The Rose". It stayed at number-one for two weeks in the said UK Chart, their first time since their 2005 single, "You Raise Me Up", fourteen years ago. Only one of five of their fourteen number-one singles that lasted two weeks or more at the top of the said chart. It was their first appearance in the number-one chart by Westlife members and by member Filan since "Bridge over Troubled Water" charity single as part of its assemble in 2017 and his solo single "Everything to Me" in 2013. This is their first No. 1 three-word song title single and original song and single in the Official UK Singles Physical Chart and Official Irish Singles Sales Chart since "Flying Without Wings" in 1999. This is their first top two three-word song title single in the Official Irish Singles Sales Chart and UK Singles Physical Chart since "What About Now" in 2009. 
It also reached number-two on UK Singles Trending Chart, number thirty-two on UK Singles Video Streams Chart and number-ninety on UK Singles Audio Streams Chart. It sold 20,675 on its second week according to Music Week. It was the most downloaded song over that weekend and the day of Saturday. On its third week, it rose to number-five in Scotland, and number sixty-eight in UK Singles Audio Streams Chart and number fifty-three on the same said chart on its fourth week.

This is their first chart-topper in 2019 and in 2010s decade. The single was their 28th Top 10 hit on Ireland. It makes the single their 27th UK Top 20 and Top 40, and 28th Top 75 hit as well. In Ireland and Scotland, it is their highest charting on their official singles charts since the band's "What About Now" single in 2009, ten years ago. While it is their highest charting original song and single in the UK since the band's single "Safe" in 2010 after peaking at number thirteen overall in the UK Singles Chart with combined sales determined. It is also their highest-charting single since the number-one hit "Everybody Hurts" as part of an assemble in 2010 in UK and Ireland. The single spent nine weeks in the UK Singles Chart Top 40, six weeks in the top 30, three weeks in the top 20 and their sixteenth longest running hit there. This is their first original song and single to have a certification since their 2002 single "Unbreakable", seventeen years ago. It makes the single as the most successful original song and single since 2002 as well. Overall, it made the single their most successful single on their digital, downloads and streaming history that they recently released worldwide so far. The single has been certified Silver in the UK only four months after its release.

It also charted on official digital charts of Cambodia, Hong Kong, Indonesia, Malaysia, Philippines, Singapore and Vietnam. It debuted on Belgium (Flanders and Wallonia), Netherlands, New Zealand and Sweden Heatseeker Charts. It premiered and had broadcast in the biggest radio station in Spain and Latin America, Los 40. It charted in a music channel in the Philippines and in some radio stations in Belgium, Croatia, Germany, Hong Kong, Indonesia, Ireland, Japan, Lithuania, Slovenia, South Africa, Spain, Sri Lanka, Sweden, Taiwan, Thailand, and United Kingdom respectively. It was the most requested song in a radio station in Macedonia. It peaked at number one in new songs and international categories and number two in the international music video category in the biggest music streaming media in China, QQ Music. The single was played over 1.8 million streams on Spotify as of 17 January 2019 and 65 million streams globally as of May 2019. It peaked so far at number fifty-five in the Official Daily Chart of Spotify UK and number two on Spotify Ireland.

It peaked at number-two in Irish Monthly Radio Airplay Chart, number-one for weeks as the Top Irish music artist on the Irish Radio Airplay Charts (making the single as one of the top three Irish song played in Ireland in 2019) and number thirty-three in UK TV Airplay Chart. It was at number-forty in UK Commercial Radio Airplay Chart. It debuted on A-List playlist and became the "Record of the Week" of BBC Radio 2, made it on MTV Hits UK (where it was the "Video of the Week") and Shoot Music Sport UK Playlist, and charted at number-two on Capital FM UK and Heart FM UK's Big Top 40. Hello My Love has had over 30,000 plays at UK radio to an audience of 275 million, and is one of the most played songs of 2019 on BBC Radio 2.  It reached the top 40 of more than eighty UK radio stations and more than twenty Irish radio stations on its total run so far.

The acoustic version of the song reached number twenty-five on Philippines' digital chart and charted on iTunes Store of some countries like Denmark, Indonesia, Ireland and United Kingdom.

Promotion

Synopsis
In 2019, the group began promotion of the song on 7 January with a nine-second video clip. The clip was viewed over 250,000 times in the first 24 hours across Twitter and Instagram. The video premiere promotion has also been made in the United Kingdom, Ireland, Germany, Indonesia and Philippines. Their first tour together outside UK and Ireland in seven years was on Singapore on 29 January 2019 to 1 February 2019 to promote "Hello My Love". A press conference was made with interviews with different media outlets from different countries, mostly from the Asian continent. Phone interviews were also made in February 2019 to Mexico and South Africa. A phone competition was also made where the fans can leave their voicemail that starts with "Hello My Love" then their follow-up message to a given hotline. It was available only on selected countries like the Philippines, the United Kingdom and the United States.

Live performances and interviews

Radio
Several radio interviews of Westlife were aired on 10 January 2019 after the premiere of the single, before 0900 GMT on FM104, 1000 GMT on Magic FM, 1100 GMT on Cool FM, More Radio Mid-Sussex and 1600 GMT on Wave FM.

Television
Their first UK recorded television appearance and performance together in six years was on The Graham Norton Show on 11 January 2019 where they  performed the new single as well. The forthcoming single was slated to have an Irish debut live performance on talk programme The Late Late Show, but their first Irish performance and television appearance together happened in the finals night of Dancing With the Stars on 24 March 2019 performing this single. They also performed the single on the 24th National Television Awards on 22 January 2019 and will make as their first live television performance, first The O2 Arena and arena performance together in seven years. They also pre-recorded a live performance of the single in All Round to Mrs. Brown's in February 2019 and had its live telecast on 20 April 2019.

They also promoted the single with a live performance in a German television awards in Goldene Kamera on 30 March 2019 in Berlin, their first promotion in mainland Europe since 2009.

Music video
On 13 December 2018, some fans of the band and media outlets suspected that the band was filming a music video whilst in Los Angeles, California. On 7 January 2019, they officially announced the release date of the single would be 10 January 2019 on all of their social media accounts, accompanied by a clip of the official music video. The music video was directed by Robert Hales.

On 11 January 2019, Good Morning Britain introduced the world exclusive short clip of the video. The official music video premiered on the group's official YouTube and Vevo account on the same day and it's in a three minutes and forty-four seconds in length. It trended at number-one in Ireland, number-two in the UK on YouTube. While in YouTube's latest music videos category, it trended at number-three in the Philippines, number-four in Vietnam, and number-five in Indonesia. The video was played over 2.4 million views on YouTube as of 17 January 2019 and 7 million views on 30 January 2019. This is their first official music video that premiered on its original first week date to cross the ten million and fourteen million mark since their 2009 single, "What About Now", ten years ago. It also topped the Music Video Chart of iTunes UK and Ireland.

It was shot on Joshua Tree, California. Wiwibloggs described the video, "Such a setting could have easily made the clip quite ‘beige’ overall. However, they add in a bit of colour by blowing up a hot air balloon that has a multi-coloured-stripped pattern to it and jamming out inside." Carl Kinsella of joe.ie added, "Today, the lads have followed it up with a music video to rival the Westlife classics of old. Much like the videos for "Obvious" and "My Love", this one sees them wandering around a pretty landscape without anyone else in sight. The video ends with the lads performing inside the balloon part of a hot air balloon before it takes off — hopefully not with them inside." The last time the band made a desert themed music video was their mid-tempo 2008 single "Something Right" and their 2011 ballad single "Lighthouse".

Accolades

RTE Choice Music Prize

Tours performed at
The Twenty Tour (2019)
Wild Dreams Tour (2022)

Formats and track listings
Digital download / streaming
"Hello My Love" – 3:34

CD single
"Hello My Love" – 3:34
"Hello My Love"  – 3:34

Digital download
"Hello My Love"  – 4:14

Streaming
"Hello My Love"  – 4:14
"Hello My Love" – 3:34

Digital download
"Hello My Love"  – 3:31

Streaming (Deezer)
"Hello My Love"  – 3:31

Streaming (Spotify)
"Hello My Love"  – 3:31
"Hello My Love" – 3:34
"Hello My Love"  – 4:14

Promotional CD Single
"Hello My Love" (John Gibbons remix) – 3:31
"Hello My Love" (John Gibbons extended mix) – 4:34
"Hello My Love" (John Gibbons instrumental) – 3:30
"Hello My Love" (John Gibbons extended instrumental) – 4:34

Promotional CD Single
"Hello My Love"  – 3:34
"Hello My Love"  – 4:14
"Hello My Love" (John Gibbons remix) – 3:31
"Hello My Love" (John Gibbons instrumental) – 3:30

Credits and personnel
Credits adapted from Tidal.

Single Mix
 Westlife (Kian Egan, Mark Feehily, Nicky Byrne, Shane Filan) – vocals, associated performer
 Ed Sheeran – songwriting
 Steve Mac – production, songwriting, keyboards, piano
 Chris Laws – drums, engineering, programming
 Dann Pursey – engineering, programming
 John Parricelli – guitar
 John Hanes – mixing engineer
 Serban Ghenea – mixing
 Randy Merrill – mastering
 Bill Zimmerman – engineering
 Jordan Jay - A&R

Acoustic
 Westlife (Kian Egan, Mark Feehily, Nicky Byrne, Shane Filan) – vocals, associated performer
Ed Sheeran – composer, lyricist
Steve Mac – composer, lyricist
Rick Parkhouse – acoustic guitar, associated performer, programming
George Tizzard – acoustic guitar, associated performer, programming
Alex Gordon – mastering engineer, studio personnel
Red Triangle – mixer, producer

Remix
 Westlife (Kian Egan, Mark Feehily, Nicky Byrne, Shane Filan) – vocals, main artists, associated performer
 Steve Mac – production, songwriting, keyboards, piano, composer, lyricist
 John Gibbons – producer, re-mixer, mixing
 Colin Hanley – producer
 Ed Sheeran – songwriting, composer, lyricist
 Chris Laws – associated performer, drums, engineering, programming, studio personnel
 Dann Pursey – engineering, programming, studio personnel
 John Parricelli – guitar, associated performer
 John Hanes – mixing engineer, studio personnel
 Serban Ghenea – mixing, studio personnel
Wez Clarke – mixing 
 Kevin Grainger – mastering engineer, studio personnel

Charts

Weekly charts

Year-end charts

Certifications and sales

Release history

References

Westlife songs
2019 singles
2019 songs
Virgin EMI Records singles
Universal Music Group singles
Song recordings produced by Steve Mac
Songs written by Steve Mac
Songs written by Ed Sheeran